Moron 5.2: The Transformation is a 2014 Filipino comedy film that is the direct sequel of Moron 5 and the Crying Lady starring Luis Manzano, Billy Crawford, Marvin Agustin, Matteo Guidicelli, DJ Durano and John Lapus.

This is also the last film appearance of comedian German Moreno, who died in a cardiac arrest in Quezon City, Diliman on January 8, 2016, at the aged of 82.

The film also stars Matteo Guidicelli as a replacement of Martin Escudero due to scheduling conflicts.

Plot
Five men with low IQs become superheroes in an attempt to make their children proud. Beckie Pamintuan (John Lapus) will never stop until the 5 idiotic friends taste defeat. Willing to do anything to see the friends fall apart as revenge to his humiliation.

Cast

Main characters
 Luis Manzano as Albert Macapagal
 Billy Crawford as Isaac Estrada
 Marvin Agustin as Aristotle Ramos
 DJ Durano as Mozart Twister Aquino
 Matteo Guidicelli as Michael Angelo Marcos
 Martin Escudero as Michael Angelo in flashback (uncredited)
 John Lapus as Becky Pamintuan

Supporting characters
 Nikki Valdez as Marife Ramos
 Mylene Dizon as Sally Aquino
 Yam Concepcion as Selina Macapagal
 Danita Paner as Amor Estrada
 Joy Viado† as Sarah Joy/Tiyahin of Aris (flashback)
 German Moreno† as Isaac's father
 Dennis Padilla as Michael's father
 Jon Santos as Albert's mother
 Divina Valencia as Albert's mother-in-law
 Deborah Sun as Mozart's mother
 Joey Paras as Congressman
 Karla Estrada as Doctor 1
 Manuel Chua as Thomas
 Boom Labrusca as Edison
 Chrome Cosio as Benok 
 Marco Masa as Macoy Macapagal
 Chlaui Malayao as Coring Aquino
 Rain Prince Allan Quite as Fidel
 Gabriel Soldevilla as Gloria
 Lao Raymundo as Professor
 Jelson Bay as Doctor 2
 Atak Arana as Albert's brother-in-law
 Tess Antonio as Principal
 Ricky Rivero as Hostage Taker
 Rubi Rubi as Doctor 3
 Daniel Pacia as Aristotle's brother-in-law
 Carlos Agassi as Abdul Ador Remi
 Marnie Lapus as Jeannie Napoles

Special participation
 Vhong Navarro as himself
 Vice Ganda as himself

Filming
The filming began in 2013 and wrapped up in about 2 months.

Reception
The film received a negative review from one critic  for its casting, storyline, and some crude humor.

References

External links

2014 films
2010s Tagalog-language films
Philippine comedy films
2014 comedy films
Viva Films films
Films directed by Wenn V. Deramas